The Moselle Open (Open de Moselle from 2003 to 2010) is a professional tennis tournament played on indoor hard courts. It is part of the ATP Tour 250 series of the ATP Tour from 2003, The venue for the tournament was most recently the Arènes and was the Parc des Expositions from 2011 to 2013.

The tournament is one of the four French events of the ATP Tour 250 series, along with the Open Sud de France, the Open 13 and the Lyon Open.

Past finals

Singles

Doubles

See also
 Lorraine Open – men's tournament (1979–1989) held in Nancy and Metz

External links
 

 
ATP Tour
Hard court tennis tournaments
Indoor tennis tournaments
Recurring sporting events established in 2003
Tennis tournaments in France
Sport in Metz
2003 establishments in France